Conan the Freebooter is a 1968 collection of five fantasy short stories by American writers Robert E. Howard and L. Sprague de Camp, featuring Howard's sword and sorcery hero Conan the Barbarian. Most of the stories originally appeared in the fantasy magazine Weird Tales in the 1930s. The book has been reprinted a number of times by various publishers, and has also been translated into German, Spanish, Portuguese, Dutch, Swedish, Italian, and Japanese. It was later gathered together with Conan and Conan of Cimmeria into the omnibus collection The Conan Chronicles (1989).

Short stories
"Introduction" (L. Sprague de Camp)
"Hawks over Shem" (Robert E. Howard and L. Sprague de Camp)
"Black Colossus" (Robert E. Howard)
"Shadows in the Moonlight" (Robert E. Howard)
"The Road of the Eagles" (Robert E. Howard and L. Sprague de Camp)
"A Witch Shall be Born" (Robert E. Howard)

Plot
In these stories from Conan's late twenties, the Cimmerian is a mercenary with the Free Company in the city-states of Shem and the lands to the north and east, a war leader of the steppe-raiding Kozaki, and finally a soldier in the service of the kingdom of Khauran.

Chronologically, the five short stories collected as Conan the Freebooter fall between Conan of Cimmeria and Conan the Wanderer.

References

1968 short story collections
Conan the Barbarian books
Fantasy short story collections by L. Sprague de Camp
Fantasy short story collections
Lancer Books books